Ha Joo-hee (born September 18, 1982) is a South Korean actress, model, and entertainer. Ha debuted as a model in the magazine Cindy the Perky in September 2001. She debuted as an actress after appearing as Junko in the 2003 South Korean TV series, Thousand Years of Love.

Filmography

Film

Television series

Awards

References

External links 
  

South Korean film actresses
South Korean television actresses
Sungkyunkwan University alumni
1982 births
Living people
21st-century South Korean actresses